Bit rate reduction may refer to:

 Bit-rate reduction, a synonym for data compression
 Bit Rate Reduction, an audio compression format used by the SPC-700 processing core of the Nintendo S-SMP, the audio processing unit of the Super Nintendo Entertainment System